Kömürler is a village in the Nurdağı District, Gaziantep Province, Turkey. The village is populated by Turks, Kurds, and Arabs, and had a population of 402 in 2022.

References

Villages in Nurdağı District
Kurdish settlements in Gaziantep Province